Ben Jonson (c. 11 June 1572 – c. 16 August 1637) collected his plays and other writings into a book he titled The Workes of Benjamin Jonson. In 1616 it was printed in London in the form of a folio. Second and third editions of his works were published posthumously in 1640 and 1692.

These editions of Ben Jonson's works were a crucial development in the publication of English Renaissance drama. The first folio collection, The Workes of Benjamin Jonson, treated stage plays as serious works of literature and stood as a precedent for other play collections that followed—notably the First Folio of Shakespeare's plays in 1623, the first Beaumont and Fletcher folio in 1647, and other collections that were important in preserving the dramatic literature of the age.

The first folio, 1616
The Workes of Benjamin Jonson, the first Jonson folio of 1616, printed and published by William Stansby and sold through bookseller Richard Meighen, contained nine plays all previously published, two works of non-dramatic poetry, thirteen masques, and six "entertainments".

Plays:
 Every Man in His Humour
 Every Man out of His Humour
 Cynthia's Revels
 The Poetaster
 Sejanus His Fall
 Volpone
 Epicoene, or the Silent Woman
 The Alchemist
 Catiline His Conspiracy
 Poetry:
 Epigrams
 The Forest
 Masques:
 The Masque of Blackness
 The Masque of Beauty
 Hymenaei
 The Hue and Cry After Cupid
 The Masque of Queens
 The Speeches at Prince Henry's Barriers
 Oberon, the Faery Prince
 Love Freed from Ignorance and Folly
 Love Restored
 A Challenge at Tilt, at a Marriage
 The Irish Masque at Court
 Mercury Vindicated from the Alchemists
 The Golden Age Restored
 Entertainments:
 The King's Entertainment in Passing to His Coronation [The Coronation Triumph]
 A Panegyre, on the Happy Entrance of James
 A Particular Entertainment of the Queen and Prince (at Althorp) [The Satyr]
 A Private Entertainment of the King and Queen (on May-Day) [The Penates]
 The Entertainment of the Two Kings (of Great Britain and Denmark) [The Hours]
 An Entertainment of King James and Queen Anne

The first five of the masques, from The Masque of Blackness through The Masque of Queens, had been printed previously; as had A Panegyre, on the Happy Entrance of James and the Epigrams.

The abortive 1631 addition
In 1631 Jonson planned a second volume to be added to the 1616 folio, a collection of later-written works to be published by Robert Allot. Jonson, however, became dissatisfied with the quality of the printing (by John Beale), and cancelled the project. Three plays were set into type for the projected collection, and printings of those typecasts were circulated—though whether they were sold commercially or distributed privately by Jonson is unclear. The three plays are:
 Bartholomew Fair
 The Devil Is an Ass
 The Staple of News

Allot died in 1635; in the 1637–39 period, the rights to Jonson's works were involved in a complex legal dispute between Philip Chetwinde, the second husband of Allot's widow, and stationers Andrew Crooke and John Legatt. Crooke and Legatt believed they owned the rights to the works.

The second folio, 1640/1
Two folio collections of Jonsonian works were issued in 1640-41. The first, printed by Richard Bishop for Andrew Crooke, was a 1640 reprint of the 1616 folio with corrections and emendations; it has sometimes been termed "the second edition of the first folio." The second volume was edited by Jonson's literary executor Sir Kenelm Digby, and published by Richard Meighen, in co-operation with Chetwinde. That volume contained later works, most of them unpublished or uncollected previously—six plays (including the three printed in 1631), two of them incomplete, and fifteen masques, plus miscellaneous pieces. In the Digby/Meighen volume—identified on its title page as "the Second Volume" of Jonson's works—the varying dates (1631, 1640, 1641) in some of the texts, and what editor William Savage Johnson once called "irregularity in contents and arrangement in different copies," have caused significant confusion.

 Plays:
 Bartholomew Fair
 The Devil Is an Ass
 The Magnetic Lady
 A Tale of a Tub
 The Sad Shepherd (unfinished)
 Mortimer: His Fall (fragment)
 Masques:
 Christmas, His Masque
 A Masque Presented in the House of Lord Hay
 The Vision of Delight
 Pleasure Reconciled to Virtue
 For the Honour of Wales
 News from the New World Discovered in the Moon
 A Masque of the Metamorphos'd Gypsies
 The Masque of Augurs
 Time Vindicated to Himself and to His Honours
 Neptune's Triumph for the Return of Albion
 Pan's Anniversary, or The Shepherd's Holiday
 The Masque of Owls
 The Fortunate Isles, and Their Union
 Love's Triumph Through Callipolis
 Chloridia: Rites to Chloris and Her Nymphs
 The King's Entertainment at Welbeck
 Love's Welcome at Bolsover
 Miscellaneous:
 Underwoods
 Horace, His Art of Poetry
 The English Grammar
 Timber, or Discoveries

The third folio, 1692
The 1692 single-volume third folio was printed by Thomas Hodgkin and published by a syndicate of booksellers—the title page lists H[enry] Herringman, E. Brewster, T. Bassett, R. Chiswell, M. Wotton, and G. Conyers. The third folio added two works to the previous total: the play The New Inn, and Leges Convivales.

Two other works by Jonson were left out of the 17th-century folios but added to later editions: the plays The Case is Altered and Eastward Ho (the latter written with Marston and George Chapman).

Notes

References
 Brady, Jennifer, and W. H. Herendeen, eds. Ben Jonson's 1616 Folio. Newark, DE, University of Delaware Press, 1991.
 Brock, Dewey Howard. A Ben Jonson Companion. Bloomington, Indiana University Press, 1983.
 Harp, Richard, and Stanley Stewart, eds. The Cambridge Companion to Ben Jonson. Cambridge, Cambridge University Press, 2000.
 Loxley, James. The Complete Critical Guide to Ben Jonson. London, Routledge, 2002.
 Williams, W. P. "Chetwin, Crooke, and the Jonson Folios." Studies in Bibliography 30 (1977).

External links
 Digitized facsimile of Jonson's First Folio, 1616
 Watermarks of the 1616 folio
 Digitized Facsimiles of Jonson's second folio, 1640/1 Jonson's second folio, 1640/1

Bibliography
Masques by Ben Jonson
Plays by Ben Jonson